Lax Lake is a lake in Lake County, in the U.S. state of Minnesota.

Lax Lake derives its name from John Waxlax, an early settler.

See also
List of lakes in Minnesota

References

Lakes of Minnesota
Lakes of Lake County, Minnesota